Upper Batley railway station served the town of Batley, in the historical county of West Riding of Yorkshire, England, from 1863 to 1952 on the Batley to Adwalton Junction Line.

History 
The station was opened on 19 August 1863 by the Great Northern Railway. It closed on 4 February 1952. The nearby signal box still survives.

References

External links 

Disused railway stations in West Yorkshire
Former Great Northern Railway stations
Railway stations in Great Britain opened in 1863
Railway stations in Great Britain closed in 1952
1863 establishments in England
1952 disestablishments in England